Sir Stephen Geoffrey Houghton CBE (born 27 April 1958) is an English member of United Kingdom Labour party local government politician and Leader of  Barnsley Metropolitan Borough Council.

Political career
Hougthon was first elected to the Barnsley Metropolitan Borough Council in 1988, and became Leader of the Council and Chairman of Cabinet in 1996. 

He is also a member of the Barnsley North East Area Council and are also appointed to the following outside bodies: Captain Allotts Charity, Cudworth United Charities, Inclusive Economy Board, Leeds City Region Partnership Committee, Local Government Association (LGA) - General Assembly, Migration Yorkshire (Chair), Sheffield City Region Combined Authority, Sheffield City Region Local Enterprise Partnership Board, Special Interest Group of Municipal Authorities (SIGOMA), and South Yorkshire Leaders' Meeting. 

In 1999, Houghton became Chair of the Special Interest Group of Metropolitan Authorities within LGA.

Education
Houghton graduated from Birmingham University with an MSc in Local Governance in 2004.

Honors
Houghton was appointed a Commander of the Order of the British Empire (CBE) for services to Local Government in the 2004 New Year Honours. Houghton was appointed a Knight Bachelor in the 2013 Birthday Honours for parliamentary and political services.

References

1958 births
Living people
Alumni of the University of Birmingham
Labour Party (UK) councillors
Politics of Barnsley
Knights Bachelor
Commanders of the Order of the British Empire
Leaders of local authorities of England